Laurier Avenue is a street in Ottawa, Canada.

Laurier Avenue may also refer to:
 Laurier Avenue (Montreal)

See also 
 Laurier (disambiguation)
 Rue Laurier, in Gatineau, Quebec, Canada